"The Schoolmistress" is a 1967 Australian TV play based on The Schoolmistress by  Arthur Wing Pinero. John Croyston directed based on a stage play presented by Alexander Hay. It aired as part of Wednesday Theatre.

Plot
At a girls school one of the girls is secretly married to a young man her parents have forbidden her to see.

Cast 
 David Copping
 Kirrily Nolan
 Jeanie Drynan
 Judith Fisher as Peggy Hesslrigge
 Jacki Weaver
 Clarissa Kaye-Mason
 Frank Lloyd
 Alan Edwards
 Marion Johns

Production 
It was a TV version of a production of the play that was then running at the Old Tote.

Reception 
The Sydney Morning Herald to put the play "into the telly machine is like asking a Ford Mustang to run on oats" but admitted "_Croyston's lighting and camera movements show detailed thought and are worked to effect. He cannot help losing colour or the third dimension, but he has kept the essential frothiness and has puffed it further with cleverly caught close-ups and so on" but that "the 90 minutes of TV seem to take longer than the 140 minutes of theatre."

The Sunday Sydney Morning Herald called it "a most enjoyable affair... the whole enterprise was one of ABN-2's more successful experiments."

References

External links 
 

1967 television plays
1967 Australian television episodes
1960s Australian television plays
Wednesday Theatre (season 3) episodes